Gordon Albert Pulley (born 18 September 1936) is an English former professional footballer. His clubs included Millwall, Gillingham, where he made over 200 Football League appearances, and Peterborough United.

References

1936 births
Sportspeople from Stourbridge
Living people
English footballers
Association football wingers
Stourbridge F.C. players
Oswestry Town F.C. players
Millwall F.C. players
Gillingham F.C. players
Peterborough United F.C. players
Chelmsford City F.C. players
Ramsgate F.C. players
Folkestone F.C. players
English Football League players
English football managers